Herman Løvenskiold may refer to:

 Herman Løvenskiold (politician) (1869–1927), Norwegian military officer and politician for the Conservative Party
 Herman Severin Løvenskiold (1815–1870), Norwegian composer
 Herman L. Løvenskiold (1897–1982), Norwegian ornithologist, photographer, government scholar and author on heraldry